This is a list of mosques in Germany by states. According to the Bundestag researchers, Germany is home to "at least 2,350 to 2,750 mosque congregations or associations". The Central Council of Muslims in Germany announced in early October that there are roughly 2,500 mosques.

Baden-Württemberg

Bavaria

Berlin

Bremen

Hamburg

Hessen

Lower Saxony

North Rhine-Westphalia

Rhineland-Palatinate

Saxony

Schleswig-Holstein

Thuringia

Group

See also 

 Islam in Germany
 List of mosques in Europe

References 

 
Germany
Mosques